Exiguobacterium antarcticum is a bacterium from the genus of Exiguobacterium which has been isolated from a biofilm from the Ginger Lake from the King George Island.

References

 

Bacillaceae
Bacteria described in 2002